Garfield County is a county located in the U.S. state of Colorado. As of the 2020 census, the population was 61,685. The county seat is Glenwood Springs. The county is named in honor of United States President James A. Garfield. Garfield County is included in the Glenwood Springs, CO Micropolitan Statistical Area, which is also included in the Edwards-Glenwood Springs, CO Combined Statistical Area.

Geography

Adjacent counties
Rio Blanco County - north
Routt County - northeast
Eagle County - east
Pitkin County - southeast
Mesa County - south
Grand County, Utah - southwest
Uintah County, Utah - northwest

Major highways
  Interstate 70

  U.S. Highway 6
  State Highway 13
  State Highway 82
  State Highway 133
  State Highway 139
  State Highway 325

Protected areas
Flat Tops Wilderness
Grand Mesa National Forest
Harvey Gap State Park
Rifle Falls State Park
Rifle Gap State Park
Routt National Forest
White River National Forest

Scenic byways
Dinosaur Diamond Prehistoric Highway National Scenic Byway
Flat Tops Trail Scenic Byway
West Elk Loop Scenic Byway

Demographics

The 2019 Census population estimate for Garfield County is 60,061, a 6.5% increase from the 2010 Census.

 Population density per square mile: 19.1 (2010)
 Race Estimations (2019)
 White alone, not Hispanic or Latino (67.4%)
 Hispanic or Latino (29.3%)
 Black or African American alone (1.3%)
 American Indian and Alaskan Native alone (1.7%)
 Asian, alone (0.9%)
 Two or more races (2.0%)
 Age and Sex Estimations (2019)
 Persons under 5 years of age (6.8%)
 Persons under 18 years of age (24.9%)
 Persons 65 years of age and over (13.8%)
 Female persons (48.9%)
 Housing
 Housing units, 2019: (24,363)
 Owner occupied housing unit rate, 2014-2018: (66.9%)
 Persons per household, 2014-2018: (2.73)
 Education (2014-2018) 
 High school graduate (87.5%)
 Bachelor's degree or higher (30.0%)
 Income and Poverty (2014 - 2018)
 Median household income: ($72, 898)
 Per capita income: $32,491)
 Persons in poverty: (8.4%)

Politics
Voting participation rates in Garfield County are above the U.S. national average. In the 2018 General Election, 65% of eligible voters participated. In the 2020 presidential election, 84.47% eligible voters participated. The county leans slightly Republican based on vote totals in elections (2008 - 2018 data) with an estimated range of two to one-thousand votes often determining candidate outcomes for the county.

Garfield County has primarily voted for Republican Party candidates in presidential elections throughout its history, with the county only failing to back the Republican candidates ten times from 1884 to 2020. Although the county includes the relatively liberal city of Glenwood Springs, this is outweighed by the extremely conservative city of Rifle, as well as the nearby towns of Silt, Parachute, and Battlement Mesa. Until 2020, the most recent Democratic win was by Bill Clinton in 1992, but Republicans were held to a plurality of the county's votes in half of the six following presidential elections prior to 2020. Notably, Barack Obama lost the county to John McCain by two votes in 2008.

In 2020, Joe Biden became the first Democratic presidential candidate to win the county since Clinton in 1992, with about 50% of the vote. No Democratic presidential candidate has won a majority of the vote in the county since Lyndon B. Johnson in 1964, although in 2020, Joe Biden was just 26 votes shy of having the majority of the vote in the county.

The county lies in Colorado's 3rd congressional district, represented by local Rifle resident Lauren Boebert.

Communities

Cities
Glenwood Springs
Rifle

Towns

 Carbonate (ghost town)

Carbondale
New Castle
Silt
Parachute

Census-designated places
Battlement Mesa
Catherine
Cattle Creek
Chacra
Mulford
No Name

See also

Colorado
Outline of Colorado
Index of Colorado-related articles
Bibliography of Colorado
Geography of Colorado
History of Colorado
Colorado statistical areas
Glenwood Springs, CO Micropolitan Statistical Area
List of counties in Colorado
Garfield County, Colorado
National Register of Historic Places listings in Garfield County, Colorado
List of places in Colorado
List of census-designated places in Colorado
List of forts in Colorado
List of ghost towns in Colorado
List of mountain passes in Colorado
List of mountain peaks of Colorado
List of municipalities in Colorado
List of post offices in Colorado
Protected areas of Colorado

References

External links
Garfield County Government website
Garfield County Statistical Data
Colorado County Evolution by Don Stanwyck
Colorado Historical Society

 

 
Colorado counties
1883 establishments in Colorado
Populated places established in 1883